Coercion is the practice of compelling a person to behave in an involuntary way.

Coercion may also refer to:

 Coercion (linguistics), reinterpretation of a lexeme
 Coercive function, mathematical function that "grows rapidly" at the extremes of the space on which it is defined
 Type conversion, in programming, is changing an entity of one data type into another
 Coercion Acts, Acts of the British parliament to suppress disorder, often in Ireland
 Coercivity, intensity of magnetic field needed to demagnetize a material
Coercive diplomacy